Willem de Keyser may refer to:

 Willem de Keyser (architect) (1603–after 1674), Dutch architect and sculptor
 Willem de Keyser (painter) (c. 1647–1692), Flemish painter